The 2022–23 season is the 121st in the history of Grazer AK and their fourth consecutive season in the top flight. The club are participating in the Austrian Football Second League and the Austrian Cup.

Players

First team squad

Out on loan

Transfers

Pre-season and friendlies

Competitions

Overall record

Austrian Football Second League

League table

Results summary

Results by round

Matches 
The league fixtures were announced on 24 June 2022.

Austrian Cup

References

Grazer AK seasons
Grazer AK